Beyond Our Ken (公主復仇記) is a 2004 Hong Kong film directed by Pang Ho-Cheung, and starring Gillian Chung, Tao Hong and Daniel Wu.

Plot
The story tells about Ching (Gillian Chung), who was dumped by her playboy boyfriend Ken (Daniel Wu). She tracks down his new girlfriend Shirley (Tao Hong) and claims that Ken uploaded nude photos of her to a website.

Cast
 Gillian Chung - Ching
 Tao Hong - Shirley
 Daniel Wu - Ken
 Jim Chim - Shirley's ex-boyfriend
 Emme Wong
 Jimmy Wong
 Anna Ng
 Wong Hiu
 On Yeung

See also
 Edison Chen photo scandal

References

External links
 
 

2004 films
2000s Cantonese-language films
Hong Kong drama films
Films directed by Pang Ho-cheung
2000s Hong Kong films